After a few places allocated to championships, the bulk of places are awarded on the basis of world rankings as at 31 May 2012. After 8 NOCs have qualified 3 athletes for an event, other NOCs are limited to 2 athletes for that event.

Qualification timeline

Qualification progress

Qualification summary

References

Qualification for the 2012 Summer Olympics